Nuestra Belleza Querétaro 2010,  was held in Hotel Misión Juriquilla, Querétaro, Querétaro on July 17, 2010. At the conclusion of the final night of competition, Natasha Kaufmann of the capital city Querétaro was crowned the winner. Kaufmann  was crowned by outgoing Nuestra Belleza Querétaro titleholder, Alejandra Cabral. Ten contestants competed for the state title.

Results

Placements

Judges
Abel López - Fashion Designer
Patricia Brogueras - Regional Cordinnator of Nuestra Belleza México
Ángeles Aguilar - Cordinnator of Nuestra Belleza Oaxaca
Carlo Antonio Rico - Producer of Nuestra Belleza México
César Torres - Plastic Surgeon
Miguel Sánchez - Painter

Contestants

Contestants Notes
Natasha Kaufmann resigned from the state crown because she was not allowed in the Universidad Contemporánea to attend the national event, for this reason, the 1st Runner-up María Perusquía, was presented to the press in a red dress, and so was crowned Nuestra Belleza Querétaro 2010, at the hands of the two coordinators present.

References

External links
Official Website

Nuestra Belleza México
2010 in Mexico